Nunca Te Diré Adiós / En Concierto is the first live album by the Puerto Rican singer Yolandita Monge. It was released in 1988 and it includes the studio version of the theme of the Puerto Rican telenovela, Ave de Paso, for which she played lead.  The rest of the album is the partial live concert held at Teatro Puerto Rico, New York, on October 16, 17, & 18, 1987.

The track "Nunca Te Diré Adiós", was written for Monge by longtime collaborator and friend Lou Briel.  On this concert, Monge performed several songs from other artists  including "Escenario" (also written by Briel), "He Vuelto" which is the Spanish translation of Pat Benatar's hit Shadows of the Night, and "Le Lo Lai" from José Feliciano. 

This album is out of print in all formats.

Track listing

Credits and personnel

Vocals: Yolandita Monge
Artistic Production: Y and B Music Corporation

Notes

Track listing and credits from album cover.
Released in Cassette Format on 1988 (DIC-10516).
Re-released digitally by ARDC Music Division/Diamante on March 21, 2018 as "En Concierto '87" along with bonus tracks.

Charts

Albums charts

Singles charts

References

1980 live albums
Yolandita Monge live albums